Weed, known in Japan as  is a Japanese manga series written and illustrated by Yoshihiro Takahashi. It is a sequel to Takahashi's 1980s manga Silver Fang -The Shooting Star Gin-, and focuses on Weed, the son of Gin, the original series' protagonist. Weed, named after the English word for wild plant, leaves his birthplace to search for his father in the Ōu Mountains. Upon arriving, Weed immediately begins protecting Ōu and its soldiers from dangerous threats. As the series progresses, Weed and his allies journey throughout Japan, aiding those in need and preventing takeovers.

Weed was originally serialized in the magazine Weekly Manga Goraku from May 1999 to July 2009. Publisher Nihon Bungeisha released 60 bound volumes and later reprinted early volumes. ComicsOne licensed the series for release in Canada and the United States by the name of Weed, but issued only three volumes before it went out of business.

In addition to the main series, Takahashi authored several side stories and books relating to Weed and the supporting cast. In 2005, NAS and SKY Perfect Well Think produced an anime series that aired on Animax. The show was released on several DVDs between 2006 and 2007 in Japan, and was licensed and distributed in Taiwan and several Nordic countries.

As of 2013, Weed had over 20 million copies in circulation, making it one of the best-selling manga series of all time.

Plot

Several years after the events of Silver Fang -The Shooting Star Gin-, Gin's son is born in the Japanese Alps. After the puppy's mother Sakura dies from an illness, an English Setter named GB pledges to bring him to the Ōu Mountains and reunite him with his father. GB decides to name the pup Weed, after the English word for wild plant, because he is "small but powerful". Upon arriving at Ōu, the pair learn that a monstrous creature is wreaking havoc and Ōu has fallen into turmoil. Gin is away, on a desperate search for his mate. Weed, GB, and other Ōu soldiers meet a team of dogs led by the German shepherd Jerome. Jerome explains that the monster is a mutated dog that escaped from a laboratory after killing several scientists. Weed's group joins them and they succeed in killing the monster, though lose several soldiers in the process, among them Gin's old ally, Smith.

The series then introduces Hōgen and Genba, Great Dane brothers who plan to create an army and overthrow Gin. When Gin and his close friends John and Akame are found by Hōgen and his troops, Akame escapes to alert Ōu, while Gin, John, and Hiro (a dog loyal to Gin) are taken as hostages. John escapes, but is killed while acting as a diversion for Hiro. Akame locates Weed and explains the situation, prompting him to search for dogs to join Ōu's army. Gin escapes and starts recruiting soldiers. Hōgen, alone after having to mercy kill Genba, launches his attack on Ōu. Weed clashes with Hōgen and is injured, but spirits of dead Ōu soldiers appear to give him strength. Weed defeats Hōgen but chooses not to kill him. Hōgen stumbles away and is found by Shōji Sudou, a policeman whose partner was killed by Genba and Hōgen. Shōji shoots and kills Hōgen.

Later, Weed encounters a dog named Yukimura, and learns that a group of monkeys have been terrorizing the area. Leading them is Shōgun, a vicious baboon that feeds on young monkeys and puppies. Shōgun had previously attacked Yukimura and his family, permanently damaging his adopted father Saheiji. Weed, his comrades, Yukimura, and several rebellious monkeys attack Shōgun and his followers. Yukimura is able to injure Shōgun enough to ensure his death, but dies in the process. Saheiji reveals that Yukimura was Weed's brother: Sakura, too sick to care for all of her children, had given two of her puppies to Saheiji to raise as foster sons.

While Jerome is in Hokkaidō, he is captured by a Russian German shepherd named Victor, who aims to conquer the island. Jerome escapes and alerts Hakurō, a former Ōu soldier who resides in Hokkaidō. Hakurō and several of his sons are attacked and killed by Victor's forces. Gin and Weed go to Hokkaidō, but are unable to defeat Victor's troops. Jerome rejoins the Ōu soldiers with Lydia and Maxim, two subordinates of Victor. Angry at Maxim's betrayal, Victor orders a friend of Maxim, Alam, to kill him. Alam feels an intense regret for following orders, but later learns that Maxim survived. Alam decides to drown Victor by dragging him underwater and entangling him in seaweed. With Victor gone, Lydia chooses to stay with Jerome while Maxim and his remaining subordinates swim back to Russia.

While traveling, Weed meets his other brother, Joe. First Joe dislikes Gin for leaving Sakura unattended in the Alps. He is unaware that Sakura had left Ōu under the false impression that Gin was dead, and that Gin had been unaware of Sakura's leaving. Joe explains that a large hybrid bear has attacked and killed his mate, Hitomi. Weed's group joins Joe to defeat the animal. During the battle, GB dies saving Weed, and Weed vows to avenge him. Weed knocks himself and the bear into a river. The bear dies after hitting a floodgate and Weed manages to survive. He returns to Ōu and learns that his mate, Koyuki, is pregnant. Weeks later, she gives birth to four pups.

Media

Manga

Weed was written and illustrated by Yoshihiro Takahashi. It is a sequel to his 1980s series Silver Fang -The Shooting Star Gin-, and follows the son of Gin, the title character from the original series. It began serialization in Weekly Manga Goraku magazine in 1999. The Japanese publisher Nihon Bungeisha released the series in collected volumes from January 2000 to September 2009. Cumulatively, 60 volumes were published. In October 2006, Nihon Bungeisha released the first volume of a reprinted edition of Weed. The company has released 22 volumes of the reprint edition, with the latest published in December 2007. The American company ComicsOne licensed the series for release in the United States and Canada in 2000 with the first three volumes released between March and June 2001. Additionally, they provided an Adobe Digital Editions e-book version. ComicsOne later went bankrupt. American publisher DrMaster acquired the rights to some of ComicsOne's titles, but not Ginga Densetsu Weed. While the physical copies are out-of-print, the e-book version is still available.
 Under their G-Comics imprint, Nihon Bungeisha released several Weed omnibus editions labeled as "specials". A series of three specials were released in April 2004 called . Throughout 2009 and 2010, another set of eight "specials" were produced: Tabidachi Hen (September 2009), Senshi no Shōmei Hen (October 2009), Inuzoku no Tsutome Hen (November 2009), Otoko no Yakusoku Hen (December 2009), Taiman Shōbu Hen (January 2010), Taishō no Utsuwa Hen (February 2010), Dōshu Taiketsu Hen (March 2010), and Uketsuga Reshi Kiba Hen (April 2010).

Related books
Nihon Bungeisha released several books authored by Takahashi that relate to the main series. , first released on August 9, 2001 and re-released in December 2007, is a collection of four short stories, including a side-story about a Golden Retriever named Mel, who is a character in the main series, and the story of Takahashi's former dog Hanako. , a collection of art, essays, and personal experiences pertaining to the attachment between people and animals, was released in November 2001. In 2002, Nihon Bungeisha released a magazine called Weed World(ウィードWORLD), which centered around Weed and related material. In total, 5 issues were published between March and May. In January 2002, an art book entitled  was released. , a book containing character biographies and statistics, was released in May 2003. In November 2005, an omnibus volume containing the prequel Ginga Densetsu Riki and Weed Gaiden, was released.

Anime
In 2005, NAS and SKY Perfect Well Think produced a 26-episode animated adaptation of Weed, directed by Toshiyuki Kato and animated by Studio Deen. The anime focused only on the Monster Arc and Hogen Arc, respectively and made some particular changes from the manga, like taking the life of a main character who survived in the manga, making characters who die in the manga live and making Weed the only son of Gin. In Japan, the series aired from November 3, 2005 to May 11, 2006 on Animax with the SKY PerfecTV! service. On December 7, 2005, Imperial Records released a single containing the themes and karaoke versions. The full soundtrack for the series, composed by  Y2 DOGS, was released by Imperial Records on January 25, 2006. The entirety of Weed was initially released on 13 DVDs published between February 17, 2006 and March 1, 2007. On August 29, 2008, a complete box set containing all 13 discs was released. The electronics company Sankyo created a Weed pachinko game that utilizes the anime character designs.

Top-Insight International licensed Weed for release in Taiwan. The company released seven individual DVDs, and one complete box set. The series aired in Taiwan on China Television. Future Film licensed and released the series in Finland. The company released Ginga Densetsu Weed on eight separate DVDs between August 2, 2006 and December 5, 2006. On November 14, 2007, Future Film released the entire series on a collector's edition. The release was bundled with a Weed booklet and mobile phone charm. In Sweden, AudVid distributed the series in one box set on June 15, 2007. The set included an extra 16-page booklet. The Finnish and Swedish releases included both Swedish and Finnish subtitles. In Denmark, Scanbox Entertainment released eight DVDs containing the series in 2007, and in 2008 produced two box sets containing episodes 1-13 and 14–26, respectively. In addition to a Danish dub, Scanbox's release included Danish and Norwegian subtitles.

Reception
As of 2013, Weed had over 20 million copies in circulation.

The 55th volume of Weed was listed as number 30 on the Oricon sales chart in Japan for the week December 9–15, 2008. Its sales numbers for the week were 20,059 copies, for a cumulative total of 21,320 since its release.

Weed was featured on Jason Thompson's House of 1000 Manga segment on Anime News Network. He praised the series for its story and took note of the "flavor" of having a combination of physically realistic dogs, "tropes", the dogs' knowledge of the human world (such as job occupations and dog breeds), and dog behavior involving honor, loyalty, honorifics, and auras. Thompson stated "the story is the point. If dogs are like humans, they are humans who are treated like slaves, separated from their kin, and forced to fight and hunt to survive. And that makes for some good drama. As Weed and his friends pursue their dream, they discover disturbing hints that the "dog utopia" might have turned into a dystopia". Overall, Thompson felt that the series was unique, stating that "no one else [is] making manga quite like this." In a later installment of House of 1000 Manga, Thompson expressed his preference for Takahashi's original work, Silver Fang -The Shooting Star Gin-, stating that it felt "more exciting and natural" than its "stiffer and more pompous" sequel.

Other series

Ginga Densetsu Riki
In 2002, Takahashi began publishing , a prequel to Weed and Silver Fang -The Shooting Star Gin-. It was originally serialized in the Weed World(ウィードWORLD), published by Nihon Bungeisha, between March 31, 2002 and December 10, 2002. In March 2003, Nihon Bungeisha released the collected chapters in a single book and in December 2005, it was included in the omnibus Ginga Densetsu Weed Tokubetsu Han with Weed Gaiden. Since then has been reprinted twice: 2007 and 2015. The one-shot follows Riki, father of Gin and former leader of the Ōu soldiers. Riki, though sired by the prized bear hound Shiro, is born a runt and never homed. After his mother Yamabuki is returned to her owner, Riki, stricken with sadness, decides to visit her.

During his trek, Riki is attacked by a pack of dogs and falls into a river. Riki is rescued by his father, Shiro, who advises him about the importance of strength and leaves, not knowing Riki is his son. Influenced by Shiro, Riki aims to become strong and continually visits his mother. On a later trip, Riki sees a young boy, Daisuke, hit by a truck on a mountain road and sent over the road railing. Riki howls for help, but instead attracts the dogs that had attacked him. Riki defends Daisuke until Shiro and his owner, Gohei, arrive. Shiro learns that Riki is his son. The book ends with Gohei and Shiro fighting the bear Akakabuto. A bullet becomes lodged in Akakabuto's brain, driving him insane. Riki watches as the bear grabs Shiro and they fall off a cliff.

Ginga Densetsu Weed: Orion
Takahashi began a sequel to Weed, entitled , in issue #2173 of Manga Goraku, released on July 24, 2009. The first collected volume was released by Nihon Bungeisha in November 2009 and last July 2014. The new series follows Weed's offspring: Bellatrix, Rigel, Sirius, and, in particular, Orion. They are all named after astronomical phenomenon: Orion after the Orion constellation, Rigel after the star Rigel, Sirius after the star Sirius, and Bellatrix after the star Bellatrix. Orion bears a close physical resemblance to Riki and possesses an inborn strength, but is rude and hot-headed. Rigel shares his fiery personality, while Sirius, who resembles his father, is level-headed and a peace-keeper. Bellatrix, Weed's only daughter, is portrayed as immature and whiny.

An earthquake and subsequent volcanic eruption separates Orion from his parents and siblings. Joe locates Orion and manages to rescue him, disappearing himself in the process, while Ōu soldier Sasuke gets separated from Rigel and others. With the Ōu Mountains in complete disarray, new threats arrive to exploit its weaknesses. Three sons of the Irish Wolfhound Kamakiri, a platoon leader for Hōgen, wish to avenge their father's death. Kurohabaki Masamune, the leader of the Kurohabaki Clan of ninja dogs, aims to take over Ōu and strengthen his army. He is the adoptive son of the former Kurohabaki leader, Terumune, and was previously denied leadership of the clan, despite his striving for approval. Instead, Terumune decided that his blood-related son Yamabiko, born after Masamune's arrival, would become leader. Thereafter, Masamune banished Terumune and took control of the clan. He holds a grudge against Yamabiko and plans to find and kill him. Meanwhile, members of the Kurohabaki clan roam Ōu, gathering recruits and killing those who resist.

Ginga: The Last Wars
Takahashi began publishing Ginga: The Last Wars (銀牙, THE LAST WARS) in 2015.

The series takes place six months after the end of Ginga Densetsu Weed: Orion. The dogs have been at peace, and all has seemingly gone well. However soon the monstrous bear Monsoon attacks, wanting to claim Futago Pass as his own. All the while getting vengeance for his father - Akakabuto who was killed by Gin during the events of Silver Fang -The Shooting Star Gin-.

Victory is not assured for the dogs, as an aging Gin has started to go blind. And the Supreme Commander Weed is severely injured by one of Monsoon's kin. Weed's children have been sent away for training, and are oblivious to the crisis at hand.

Ginga Densetsu Noah
Takahashi began publishing Ginga Densetsu Noah (銀牙伝説ノア) in 2019.

The series takes place few months after the events of Ginga: The Last Wars, Orion has gone missing to mourn the death of his brother, Sirius. A new army known as the Aka-Ari is making a name for themselves under the belief that the Ōu Army was killed by the bears.

References

External links
 Nihon Bungeisha's official Weed site 
 Animax's official Ginga Densetsu Weed website 
 ComicsOne's archived tWeed page
 

Animated television series about dogs
Animax
Anime series based on manga
Comics about dogs
ComicsOne titles
Drama anime and manga
Nihon Bungeisha manga
Seinen manga
Studio Deen